Chahar Hadd (also Romanized as Chahār Ḩadd and Chahār Ḩad; also known as Chahār Hāt, Chār Ḩadd, and Chārhāt) is a village in Duzaj Rural District, Kharqan District, Zarandieh County, Markazi Province, Iran. At the 2006 census, its population was 193, in 48 families.

References 
 
[  “چهارحد: زادگاه “استاد سیدعلی اصغرموسوی

 شاعر،نویسنده، پژوهشگرادبیات فارسی است.

استادموسوی دارای 6جلد کتاب شعر و تالیفات ادبی (نثرونظم) و ادبیات تطبیقی است.

استادموسوی در روز دوشنبه دوم خرداد یکهزاروسیصدوچهل و پنج (1345/3/2)در روستای چهارحد محله مسجد به دنیا آمد و اکنون در شهرقم زندگی می کند. ایشان از شاعران بنام در ایران است . اشعار وی غالبا غزل و دارای مفاهیم عرفانی و فلسفی می باشند.کتاب "آرایه های عقل و عشق " از جمله آثارشعری ایشان است.}

Populated places in Zarandieh County